Japie Krige (5 July 1879 –  14 January 1961) was a South African international rugby union player who played as a centre.

He made 5 appearances for South Africa from 1903 - 1906.

References

South African rugby union players
South Africa international rugby union players
1879 births
1961 deaths
Rugby union centres
Western Province (rugby union) players